These are the Australian number-one albums of 2000, per the ARIA Charts.

Notes
Number of number one albums: 19
Longest run at number one (during 2000): On How Life Is by Macy Gray (8 weeks)

See also
2000 in music
List of number-one singles in Australia in 2000

2000
2000 record charts
2000 in Australian music